Beulah  is an unincorporated community in the northeast corner of Lee County, Alabama, United States, just south of Valley. It is part of the Columbus, Georgia-Alabama Metropolitan Area. It is bounded by Chambers County on the north, the Chattahoochee River on the east, and the Halawaka Embayment of Lake Harding on the south.

History
Beulah is named after Beulah Baptist Church, which was organized in 1851. A post office operated under the name Beulah from 1856 to 1906.

Photo gallery

References

Further reading
Nunn, Alexander (Ed.) (1983). Lee County and Her Forebears.  Montgomery, Ala., Herff Jones. LCCCN 83-081693

Unincorporated communities in Alabama
Unincorporated communities in Lee County, Alabama
Columbus metropolitan area, Georgia